Păstrăvul River may refer to:

 Păstrăvul, a tributary of the Ozunca in Covasna County
 Păstrăvul, a tributary of the Homorodul Mic in Harghita County